Black Medicine is a collection of stories by American writer Arthur J. Burks. It was released in 1966  by Arkham House in an edition of 1,952 copies and was the author's first book published by Arkham House.  All but one of the stories had originally appeared in the magazine Weird Tales.

Contents

Black Medicine contains the following tales:

 Strange Tales of Santo Domingo
"A Broken Lamp Chimney"
"Desert of the Dead"
"Daylight Shadows"
"The Sorrowful Sisterhood"
"The Phantom Chibo"
"Faces"
 "Three Coffins"
 "When the Graves Were Opened"
 "Vale of the Corbies"
 "Voodoo"
 "Luisma's Return"
 "Thus Spake the Prophetess"
 "Black Medicine"
 "Bells of Oceana"
 "The Ghosts of Steamboat Coulee"
 "Guatemozin the Visitant"

Sources

1966 short story collections
Fantasy short story collections
Horror short story collections
Works originally published in Weird Tales